The Patient in Room 18 is a 1938 American mystery romantic comedy film directed by Bobby Connolly and Crane Wilbur. It stars Patric Knowles and Ann Sheridan. The screenplay written by Eugene Solow and Robertson White was based on a 1929 novel of the same name by author Mignon G. Eberhart.

Plot
Private investigator Lance O'Leary (Patric Knowles) suffers a nervous breakdown from being unable to solve a case and his doctor has him hospitalized for rest. It just happens to be the same place where his lady friend, Sara Keate (Ann Sheridan), is the head nurse. The first night there a murder takes place as wealthy Mr. Warren is killed in his room and $100,000 worth of medicinal radium on his chest is stolen. Also, head doctor Dr. Lethany is murdered as well. Everyone on the staff seems to have a motive and O'Leary must work with combative Inspector Foley (Cliff Clark) to solve the crime.

Cast
 Patric Knowles as Lance O'Leary
 Ann Sheridan as Nurse Sara Keate
 Eric Stanley as Seymour Bentley (O'Leary's valet)
 John Ridgely as James 'Jim' Warren
 Rosella Towne as Nurse Maida Day
 Jean Benedict as Mrs. Carol Lethany
 Charles Trowbridge as Dr. Bahman
 Cliff Clark as Inspector Foley
 Harland Tucker as Dr. Arthur Lethany
 Edward Raquello as Dr. Fred 'Freddie' Harker
 Vickie Lester as Nurse Taylor
 Edward McWade as Frank Warren
 Ralph Sanford as Det. Donahue
 Frank Orth as Joe Higgins

Release
The film was released theatrically by Warner Bros. in January 1938. It was never officially released on any home video format until issued by the Warner Archive Collection in October 2010 as part of the six-film DVD-R collection Warner Bros. Horror/Mystery Double Features.

The film was followed by the sequel Mystery House in May 1938.

References

External links 
 

1938 films
1930s crime films
1938 mystery films
1938 romantic comedy films
American black-and-white films
Films based on American novels
American mystery films
Films set in hospitals
American crime films
Films directed by Bobby Connolly
1930s American films
Films scored by Bernhard Kaun
American detective films